Xenia is a genus of photosynthetic soft marine coral in the family Xeniidae. They resemble a mushroom, with "arms" coming out from the top that end in many-fingered "hands". It is unique among corals because of its ability to use its "hands" to "pulse" or push water away from the colony in a constant, grabbing motion. Common names include fast-pulse Xenia. Species of Xenia are sometimes referred to as pulse corals.

Species
The World Register of Marine Species lists the following species:
Xenia actuosa Verseveldt & Tursch, 1979
Xenia amparoi Roxas, 1933
Xenia antarctica Kükenthal, 1902
Xenia bauiana May, 1899
Xenia crassa Schenk, 1896
Xenia crispitentaculata Verseveldt, 1977
Xenia cylindrica Roxas, 1933
Xenia danae Verrill, 1869
Xenia dayi Tixier-Durivault, 1959
Xenia delicata Roxas, 1933
Xenia depressa Kükenthal, 1909
Xenia distorta Tixier-Durivault, 1966
Xenia elongata Dana, 1846
Xenia fimbriata Utinomi, 1955
Xenia fisheri Roxas, 1933
Xenia flava Roxas, 1933
Xenia florida (Lesson, 1826)
Xenia fusca Schenk, 1896
Xenia garciae Bourne, 1894
Xenia grasshoffi Verseveldt, 1974
Xenia hicksoni Ashworth, 1899
Xenia humilis Verseveldt, 1977
Xenia intermedia Roxas, 1933
Xenia kukenthali Roxas, 1933
Xenia kusimotoensis Utinomi, 1955
Xenia lepida Verseveldt, 1971
Xenia lillieae Roxas, 1933
Xenia medusoides May, 1899
Xenia membranacea Schenk, 1896
Xenia mucosa Verseveldt & Tursch, 1979
Xenia multipinnata (Tixier-Durivault, 1966)
Xenia multispiculata Kükenthal, 1909
Xenia nana Hickson, 1930
Xenia novaebritanniae Ashworth, 1900
Xenia novaecaledoniae Verseveldt, 1974
Xenia plicata Schenk, 1896
Xenia puertogalerae Roxas, 1933
Xenia pulsitans Kent, 1893
Xenia quinqueserta May, 1899
Xenia rubens Schenk, 1896
Xenia samoensis Kölliker
Xenia sansibariana May, 1899
Xenia schenki Roxas, 1933
Xenia sexseriata Verseveldt, 1977
Xenia spicata Li, 1982
Xenia stellifera Verseveldt, 1977
Xenia ternatana Schenk, 1896
Xenia tripartita Roxas, 1933
Xenia tumbatuana May, 1898
Xenia umbellata Lamarck, 1816
Xenia viridis Schenk, 1896
Xenia viridus Schenk, 1896

References 

Xeniidae
Octocorallia genera